The Chinese Chemical Society (CCS) lays out a set of rules based on those given by the International Union of Pure and Applied Chemistry (IUPAC) for the purpose of systematic organic nomenclature in Chinese.  The chemical names derived from these rules are meant to correspond with the English IUPAC name in a manner that is close to one-to-one, while being adapted to and taking advantage of the logographic nature of the Chinese written language.  A standard set of characters invented during the 20th century (vide infra), along with characters for the chemical elements and characters corresponding to standard chemical prefixes and suffixes, are used for this purpose.

Derivation of Chinese characters
The majority of the Chinese characters used for this purpose are phonosemantic compounds, with part of the character giving a general semantic category and the other part providing a pronunciation, usually based on the international (European) pronunciation.  There are four common radicals (the part of the character that gives the semantic category) for these characters:

火 (huǒ, fire) e.g.: 烷 (wán, alkane), common for hydrocarbons
酉 (yǒu, ritual wine vessel) e.g.: 酮 (tóng, ketone), common for oxygenated functionalities
艸 (cǎo, grass) e.g. 苯 (běn, benzene, phenyl), common for aromatic compounds and terpenes
肉 (ròu, meat, flesh) e.g. 腙 (zōng, hydrazone), common for nitrogen-containing functionalities
Additionally, the mouth radical (口, kǒu) is affixed to characters that are used for their sound only.  This occurs often in the transliteration of the names of heterocyclic compounds, (e.g., 吡啶, "bǐdìng", pyridine).  These characters are also used for the transliteration of non-chemical terms from foreign languages.

Table

Below is a table, in pinyin order, of the Chinese names of major organic compounds, radicals, and functional groups.  Characters given are in traditional Chinese, followed by simplified Chinese where possible.  Since the characters are modern creations, the traditional Chinese characters are analogous (with traditional components in place of simplified components). The Mandarin pronunciation of each character, as said in Mainland China, is in pronunciation column. Any Taiwanese pronunciations that differ from the Mainland Chinese pronunciations are put in the notes. Other usages of characters are etymologically unrelated to the character's meaning as names for organic compounds, radicals, and functional groups unless otherwise stated. This list is not exhaustive, although many of the other characters used for this purpose can only be found in specialist dictionaries.

{|class="wikitable"
|+ Chinese names of organic compounds, radicals, and functional groups
|-bgcolor="#EFEFEF"
!Character ||Phonetic||Pronunciation ||Other meanings|| Origin/Notes
|-
||胺 amine||安 ān 'peace'|| àn||è (ān in Taiwan): to putrefy (of meat)'||From ammonia, 氨 ān, itself based on the European pronunciation (銨/铵 ǎn 'ammonia', with the metal radical is used for ammonium salts). Pronounced as ān in Taiwan.
|-
||薁 azulene||奥 ào 'mysterious'||ào||yù: wild grapes|| European pronunciation
|-
||苯 benzene or phenyl||本 běn 'this','root'||běn||the appearance of grass growing|| European pronunciation
|-
||吡啶 pyridine||比 bǐ 'compare' and 定 dìng 'stability'||bǐdìng|| 'slander' or 'compare'bì : bird onomatopoeia|| Transliteration
|-
||吡咯 pyrrole||比 bǐ 'compare' and 各 gè 'each'||bǐluò||gē or gé:'cackle', 'cluck', 'this', or 'pickled mustard';kǎ (luò in Taiwan):'to cough up';lo, used as an end particle.
|| Transliteration. See note for 吡啶 for other usages for 吡
|-
|吡喃 pyran
|比 bǐ 'compare' and 南 nán 'south'||bǐnán||to transliterate '-ran'.||Transliteration.
|-
|吡喃鎓 pyrylium
|比 bǐ 'compare', 南 nán 'south', and 翁 wēng 'old man': ||bǐnánwēng||||Combination of transliteration for 'pyran' and suffix for 'onium'.
|-
||苄 benzyl||卞 biàn 'hurried'||biàn|||| European pronunciation
|-
||卟吩 porphin||卜 bǔ 'foretell' and 分 fēn 'divide'||bǔfēn|| 卟 as 'jī': 'divination' or 'to consider' 吩 :'to instruct, command'.|| Transliteration. Formerly known as 㗊 léi, which depicts the porphin ring system pictographically.
|-
||醇 alcohol||享 xiǎng 'enjoy'||chún||(formerly) rich wine||Not newly coined
|-
||噠嗪/哒嗪 pyridazine||達/达 dá 'arrive at' and 秦 qín 'Qin Dynasty'||dāqín|| Transliteration.
|-
||噁唑/𫫇唑 oxazole||惡/恶 è 'evil' and 坐 zuò 'sit'||èzuò|||| Transliteration.
|-
||苊 acenaphthene||厄 è 'hardship'||è|||| European pronunciation
|-
||蒽 anthracene||恩 ēn 'favor'||ēn||a name of a grass||European pronunciation.
|-
||菲 phenanthrene||非 fēi 'not'||fēi||fragrantfěi:'poor'.|| European pronunciation. 
|-
||酚 (also 苯酚) phenol||分 fēn 'divide'||fēn (běnfēn)|||| European pronunciation
|-
||碸/砜 sulfone||風/风 fēng 'the wind'||fēng|||| European pronunciation (亞碸/亚砜 yàfēng [lit. minor sulfone], is used for sulfoxide)
|-
||呋喃 furan||夫 fū 'husband' and 南 nán 'south'||fūnán||as a variant of  趺: 'back of the foot' or 'to sit cross-legged' 喃:'chattering' or 'to mumble|| Transliteration.
|-
||呋咱 furazan||夫 fū 'husband' and 自 zì 'self'||fūzán|| 咱 :we|| Transliteration
|-
||酐 (organic or inorganic) anhydride||干 gān 'dry'||gān||bitter wine|| From (simplified) 干 gān 'dry'.
|-
||苷 glycoside||甘 gān 'sweet'||gān||'licorice|| From 甘 gān 'sweet'. Formerly known as 甙 dài, composed of 弋 from 代 dài 'substitute' and 甘 gān 'sweet'.
|-
||胍 guanidine||瓜 guā 'melon'||guā||gū: 'large abdomen' or 'stoutness' ||European pronunciation
|-
||胲 hydroxylamine||亥 hài '9-11 pm'||hǎi||gāi:'the flesh where hair grows on the big toe' ,or 'prepare'gǎi: 'cheek'|| European pronunciation. .
|-
||磺 sulfonyl||黃/黄 huáng 'yellow'||huáng|||| From 硫磺 liúhuáng 'sulfur'; e.g., 磺胺 huáng'àn (Taiwan huáng'ān) is sulfonamide
|-
||腈 nitrile||青 qīng 'blue', 'green'||jīng||pure meat|| From cyanogen, 氰 qíng (Taiwan qīng), itself derived from 青 qīng, blue/green/cyan, cf. Prussian blue
|-
||肼 hydrazine||井 jǐng 'a well'||jǐng'|||| European pronunciation
|-
||胩 isonitrile||卡 kǎ 'stop','check'||kǎ|| ||From older nomenclature carbylamine (Also known as 異腈/异腈 yìjīng [lit. different nitrile])
|-
||蒈 carane||皆 jiē 'all'||kǎi|||| European pronunciation
|-
||莰 camphane||坎 kǎn 'threshold'||kǎn|| European pronunciation
|-
||喹啉 quinoline||奎 kuí 'stride' and 林 lín 'forest'||kuílín|| 啉: lán: 'greed', 'drink a round of wine', 'finish drinking' or 'piercing noise' lìn or làn: 'stupid'.|| Transliteration.
|-
||醌 quinone||昆 kūn 'elder brother'||kūn|||| European pronunciation
|-
||膦 phosphine||粦 lín||lìn|| liǎn: 'lack of strength'.|| From 磷 lín 'phosphorus', itself from 粦 lín 'will-o'-the-wisp' (Phosphonium is 鏻 lǐn, in analogy to ammonium). Pronounced as lín in Taiwan. 
|-
||醚 ether||迷 mí 'bewilder'||mí||drunk|| From 迷 mí 'confusion', from anesthetic properties of diethyl ether.
|-
|熳 mancude||曼 màn 'graceful'||màn|||||European pronunciation.  The term mancude derives from maximum number of noncumulative double bonds.  For example, a 7-membered mancude ring system has three double bonds in it (e.g. azepine, oxepine, ...).
|-
||脒 amidine||米 mǐ 'rice'||mǐ|||| European pronunciation
|-
||咪唑 imidazole||米 mǐ 'rice' and 坐 zuò 'sit'||mǐzuò||咪: mī: onomatopoeia for cats or used to describe the appearance of a smile.||Transliteration. 
|-
||嘧啶 pyrimidine||密 mì 'dense' and 定 dìng 'stability'||mìdìng|||| Transliteration
|-
||萘 naphthalene||奈 nài 'persevere'||nài|||| European pronunciation
|-
||脲 urea||尿 niào 'urine'||niào|||| From 尿 niào 'urine'
|-
||薴/苧 limonene||寧/宁 níng 'peaceful'||níng|||薴: messy ||From 檸檬/柠檬 níngméng 'lemon'
|-
||哌啶 piperidine||𠂢 pài and 定 dìng 'stability'||pàidìng|||| Transliteration
|-
||哌嗪 piperazine||𠂢 pài and 秦 qín 'Qin Dynasty'||pàiqín|||| Transliteration
|-
||蒎 pinene||派 pài 'assign'||pài|||| European pronunciation
|-
||苉 picene||匹 pǐ 'equal'||pǐ|||| European pronunciation
|-
||嘌呤 purine||票 piào 'ticket' and 令 lìng 'make'||piàolìng||嘌: piāo:'passing swiftly' or 'speak'. 呤:líng: 'speak with a soft voice'|| Transliteration. Pronounced as piāolíng in Taiwan..
|-
||羥/羟 hydroxyl||羊 yáng 'sheep' and 巠/𢀖 jīng||qiǎng|| qiān or kēng| 'a type of sheep'.||From fusion of the sounds of 氧 yǎng 'oxygen' and 氫/氢 qīng 'hydrogen'.
|-
||巰/巯 sulfhydryl||巠/𢀖 jīng and 硫 liú 'sulfur'||qiú|||| From fusion of the sounds of 氫/氢 qīng 'hydrogen' and 硫 liú 'sulfur' (Sulfonium is 鋶/锍 liǔ, in analogy with ammonium)
|-
||醛 aldehyde||荃 quán||quán||chuò|'change in the flavour of wine' or 'pickled vegetables'.|| From 荃 quán, a type of fragrant grass, referring to the fragrance of many aldehydes. 
|-
||炔 alkyne||夬 guǎi||quē||guì: a surname, or 'the appearance of smoke'|| From 缺 quē 'deficient', referring to its unsaturation, cf. names for alkanes and alkenes. Pronounced as jué in Taiwan. .
|-
||脎 osazone||杀 shā 'kill'||sà|||| European pronunciation
|-
||噻唑 thiazole||塞 sāi 'to stop up' and 坐 zuò 'sit'||sāizuò|||| European pronunciation
|-
||胂 arsine||申 shēn 'explain'||shèn|| shēn| 'the flesh of the back'.|| From 砷 shēn 'arsenic' (Arsonium is 鉮 shěn, in analogy with ammonium). Pronounced as shēn in Taiwan.
|-
||酸 (organic or inorganic) acid||夋, qūn||suān||sour|| Not newly coined
|-
||羧 carboxyl||n.a.||suō|| zuī: woollen knitwear|| Character construction is based on combination of 氧 yǎng 'oxygen' and 酸 suān 'acid', pronunciation from European pronunciation.
|-
||肽 peptide||太 tài 'excessively'||tài|||| European pronunciation
|-
||酞 phthalein||太 tài 'excessively'||tài|||| European pronunciation
|-
||羰 carbonyl||羊 yáng 'sheep' and 炭 tàn 'charcoal' ||tāng|||| From fusion of the sounds of 氧 yǎng 'oxygen' and 碳 tàn 'carbon'. Pronounced as tàn in Taiwan.
|-
||萜 terpene||帖 tiè 'obedient'||tiē|||| European pronunciation
|-
||烴/烃 hydrocarbon||巠/𢀖 jīng||tīng||jǐng: 'warm', 'burnt smell' or 'the appearance of burning'||From fusion of the sounds of 碳 tàn 'carbon' and 氫/氢 qīng 'hydrogen'. 
|-
||酮 ketone||同 tóng 'same'||tóng|| dòng:'bad wine'.|| European pronunciation.Warning: Verbally, 酮 ('ketone') and 铜 ('copper') are both pronounced tóng and are indistinguishable.  In modern times, new chemical terminology is chosen to avoid conflicts like this.|-
||烷 alkane||完 wán 'complete'||wán||fire|| From 完 wán 'complete', referring to its saturation, cf. names for alkenes and alkynes
|-
||鎓/𬭩 onium ||翁 wēng 'old man'||wēng||spade|| European pronunciation. Used in cases when a specific 'onium' character is unavailable or uncommon, e.g., 氧鎓/氧𬭩 yǎngwēng for 'oxonium'.
|-
||肟 oxime||亏 yú 'in, on, at'||wò||||European pronunciation. Formerly known as 胜 shēng, which is also an old variant of 腥 xīng 'rank, strong-smelling', as well as the simplified character for 勝 shèng/shēng 'victory' or 'excel'. Note that 亏 is also the unrelated simplified character for 虧 kuī 'deficit', but in this context, it is the archaic variant character for 于 yú 'in, on, at.
|-
||芴 fluorene||勿 wù 'do not'||wù||an edible wild planthū:'dimly' or 'suddenly'|| European pronunciation
|-
||烯 alkene||希 xī 'infrequent'||xī||the colour of fire||From 希 xī 'sparse', referring to its unsaturation, cf. names for alkanes and alkynes
|-
||酰 (organic or inorganic) acyl|| 先 xiān 'in front'||xiān|||| From 先 xiān 'earlier [i.e. precursor]', referring to its derivation from acids. Formerly known as 醯 xī, which also means 'acid, vinegar'.
|-
|𨦡 oxonium|||羊 yáng 'goat; sheep'|||yáng|||||From oxygen, 氧 yǎng
|-
||吲哚 indole||引 yǐn 'attract' and 朵 duǒ||yǐnduǒ||||Transliteration
|-
||茚 indene||印 yìn 'impression'||yìn||a name of a grass|| European pronunciation.
|-
||甾 steroid||甾 zāi 'steroid'||zāi||.a variant of 災/灾 :zāi: 'calamity'zī:'an ancient pottery used for containing wine'|| Pictographic in origin, referring to the three side-chains (found in cholesterol) and four rings found in all steroids.
|-
||酯 ester||旨 zhǐ 'purpose'||zhǐ|||| From 脂 zhī 'lipid', referring to the ester linkages in glycerides. Formerly known as 𨤎 yán.
|-
||䓬 tropylium||卓 zhuó 'eminent'||zhuó|||| European pronunciation
|-
||腙 hydrazone||宗 zōng 'faction'||zōng||||European pronunciation
|}

Other aspects and examples

In the CCS system, carbon chain lengths are denoted by celestial stems (甲 jiǎ, 乙 yǐ, 丙 bǐng, 丁 dīng, 戊 wù, 己 jǐ, 庚 gēng, 辛 xīn, 壬 rén, 癸 guǐ), characters used since the Shang Dynasty (16th-11th centuries BCE) for naming days (and later, to name years).  For example, hexane is 己烷 jǐwán, since 己 jǐ is the sixth celestial stem.  Longer carbon chains are specified by number followed by '碳' tàn 'carbon'.  For example, 1-hexadecene is 1-十六碳烯 (read as [1, yī] [-, wèi] [十六, shíliù, '16'] [碳, tàn] [烯, xī]), where the hyphen is read as 位 (wèi, 'position').

For a more complex example, consider 3-buten-1-ol.  Its Chinese name is 3-丁烯-1-醇 (read as [3, sān] [-, wèi] [丁, dīng] [烯, xī] [1, yī] [-, wèi] [醇, chún]).

The descriptors for degree of substitution, primary, secondary, tertiary, and quaternary, are translated as 伯 (bó), 仲 (zhòng), 叔 (shū), 季 (jì), which refer to the first, second, third, and fourth male siblings in a family.  For instance, tert-butyllithium is translated as 叔丁基锂 ([叔, shū, tert'], [丁, dīng, 'but-'], [基, jī, 'yl'], [锂, lǐ, 'lithium']). Other commonly used isomeric descriptors normal-, iso-, and neo- are translated as 正 (zhèng, 'proper'), 异 (yì, 'different'), and 新 (xīn, 'new'), respectively.

The numerical prefix bis- is translated as 双 (shuāng, 'double'), while larger multiplicities are simply given by the Chinese word for the number (e.g., 四 (sì, 'four') for tetrakis-).  For example, tetrakis(triphenylphosphine)palladium is rendered 四(三苯基膦)钯, in which 三苯基膦 is triphenylphosphine and 钯 is palladium.  The prefix bi- (for joining of ring systems) is translated as 联 (lián, 'join', 'couple'), as in 联苯 for biphenyl.

The stereochemical descriptors cis- and trans- are translated as 顺 (shùn, 'along') and 反 (fǎn, 'against').  The relational prefixes ortho-, meta-, and para- are translated as 邻 (lín, 'neighboring'), 间 (jiàn, 'between'), and 对 (duì, 'opposing'), respectively.

The structural modification descriptors cyclo-, nor- and homo- are translated as 环 (huán, 'ring'),  降 (jiàng, 'lowered'), and 高 (gāo, 'high').  For example, norbornene is translated as 降冰片烯, in which the trivial name (冰片) for bornyl [literally, camphor] is used.  When substitutive nomenclature is used for naming heterocycles, the suffix 杂 (zá, 'mixed') is used in the same way as '-a' in English (as in aza, thia, oxa, etc.).  As an example, DABCO (1,4-diazabicylo[2.2.2]octane) is named 1,4-二氮杂二环［2.2.2］辛烷.

The common unsaturated groups allyl and propargyl are translated as 烯丙(基) (xībǐng(jī), 'alkene-prop-(yl)') and 炔丙(基) (qūebǐng(jī), 'alkyne-prop-(yl)').  Thus, using 高 for homo- and 烯丙 for allyl, 3-buten-1-ol is also called 高烯丙醇 (i.e., homoallyl alcohol) in Chinese via semisystematic nomenclature.

The Chinese Wikipedia page may be consulted for further details.

Pseudohalogens
The character  氯 ( lǜ, "chlorine") may on occasion mean Cl (one atom), or the bonded pair Cl2 (the molecule, the usual form of chlorine). Likewise in describing pseudohalogens, 氰 (qíng) may on occasion mean a single CN− cyanide ion (e.g. as in 氰化鉀 (qínghuàjiǎ, potassium cyanide, literally "cyanide-ion transform potassium"), or the bonded pair (CN)2 or NCCN ("cyanogen"). The similar (not identical) character 腈 (jīng) means "nitrile".

 Thermochemical terminology 
Although not substances, the thermochemical concepts entropy and enthalpy were assigned Chinese characters based on similar considerations.  The 'fire' radical, 火, is used as the semantic category.  The character for entropy, 熵 (pinyin: shāng), is derived from 商 (pinyin: shāng), which means 'quotient' in this context.  This recognizes the Clausius equation for the differential change in entropy as the differential heat absorbed divided by the temperature: dS = dQ/T''.  The character for enthalpy, 焓 (pinyin: hán), is derived from 含 (pinyin: hán), which means 'to contain.'  This character phonetically approximates the first syllable of 'enthalpy', and recognizes the definition of enthalpy as heat content.

See also
Chemical elements in East Asian languages

Notes

Chemical nomenclature
Science and technology in China

zh:IUPAC有機物命名法